Iceberg Vodka is a vodka produced by the Canadian Iceberg Vodka Corporation. The vodka is produced using water from icebergs harvested off the coast of Newfoundland blended with neutral grain alcohol from peaches and cream corn from Ontario. Iceberg's product line includes vodka, gin, rum, and flavoured vodka. It is the only national premium vodka brand that is fully owned and produced in Canada.

History
The Canadian Iceberg Vodka Corporation was founded in 1994, in Toronto, and began harvesting water from icebergs off the coast of Newfoundland in 1995. In 2013, Iceberg added three kinds of flavoured vodka to their product line: cucumber, crème brûlée, and chocolate mint.

Awards
Won the 2006–07 Golden Icon Award for Best Vodka; the Golden Icon Awards are presented annually by Travolta Family Entertainment. 
In 1998, the Beverage Tasting Institute gave Iceberg a 'superlative' score of 94 out of 100, ranking it second behind the acclaimed Grey Goose in a blind taste test of the world's best vodkas.

References

External links
Iceberg Vodka
Iceberg Vodka at iVodka.com
Iceberg Vodka on Twitter

Canadian vodkas
Canadian brands
Culture of Newfoundland and Labrador